The Veteran of Waterloo is a 1933 British short drama film directed by A. V. Bramble and starring Jerrold Robertshaw, Roger Livesey and Joan Kemp-Welch. The screenplay concerns an old soldier who recounts his participation in the 1815 Battle of Waterloo. It is based on the 1894 play A Story of Waterloo by Arthur Conan Doyle. It was produced as a quota quickie for distribution by Paramount Pictures.

Cast
 Jerrold Robertshaw as Corporal Gregory Brewster
 Roger Livesey as Sergeant MacDonald
 Joan Kemp-Welch as Norah Brewster
 A. B. Imeson as Colonel
 Minnie Rayner as Neighbour

References

Bibliography
 Chibnall, Steve. Quota Quickies: The Birth of the British 'B' Film. British Film Institute, 2007.
 Low, Rachael. Filmmaking in 1930s Britain. George Allen & Unwin, 1985.
 Wood, Linda. British Films, 1927-1939. British Film Institute, 1986.

External links

1933 films
1933 drama films
Films directed by A. V. Bramble
Films based on works by Arthur Conan Doyle
British drama films
British black-and-white films
1930s English-language films
1930s British films
Paramount Pictures films
Quota quickies
1930s historical films
British historical films
Films set in the 19th century